Ptolemy of Aloros, was sent by King Amyntas III of Macedon as an envoy to Athens c. 375–373 BC. After Amyntas' death, he began a liaison with his widow, Eurydice. In 368 BC, he assassinated her son, Alexander II, in order to gain control of the throne. His actions were not well-regarded by the leading families of Macedon, who called in the Theban general, Pelopidas, to re-establish peace.  As part of the peace settlement, Philip, Alexander II's younger brother, was taken as a hostage back to Thebes.  As Alexander II's younger brother, Perdiccas III, was under-age when Alexander II was killed, Ptolemy of Aloros ruled as regent.

Ptolemy ruled as a regent for Perdiccas III until Perdiccas killed him in 365 BC.

It is suggested that Ptolemy was descended from Amyntas II's brother, Menelaus, son of Alexander I.

References 

365 BC deaths
4th-century BC regents
Regents of Macedonia (ancient kingdom)
Ancient Alorites
People from Imathia
Theban hegemony
Old Macedonian kingdom
Ambassadors of Macedonia (ancient kingdom)
Year of birth unknown